Mission San José de Tumacácori is a historic Spanish mission preserved in its present form by Franciscans in 1828.

History
Mission San Cayetano del Tumacácori was established by Jesuits in 1691 in a location near a Sobaipuri settlement on the east side of the Santa Cruz River.
Services were held in a small adobe structure built by the inhabitants of the village.

After the O'odham rebellion of 1751 the mission was abandoned for a time.  In 1752, the village was reestablished and in 1753 the church of the Mission San José de Tumacácori began construction at the present site on the west side of the Santa Cruz River.  This first church structure was erected for use by the mission in 1757.  The architectural style of the church is Spanish Colonial.

Rumors spread within the Spanish kingdom that the Jesuit priests had amassed a fortune on the peninsula and were becoming very powerful. On February 3, 1768 King Carlos III ordered the Jesuits forcibly expelled from the Viceroyalty of New Spain (colonial México) and returned to Spain.

The mission is now part of Tumacácori National Historical Park, which contains three separate sections.

Historic Mission San José de Tumacácori gallery
These are images of the inside of the Tumacacori Mission and of the Cemetery grounds.

See also
 Spanish missions in Arizona
 Spanish Missions in the Sonoran Desert
 Presidio San Ignacio de Tubac
 List of Jesuit sites

References

Additional references
 Di Peso, Charles C., 1956; The Upper Pima of San Cayetano del Tumacacori:  An Archaeohistorical Reconstruction of the Ootam of Pimeria Alta.  The Amerind Foundation, Inc. Dragoon, Arizona.
 Dobyns, Henry F., 1959; Tubac Through Four Centuries: A Historical Resume and Analysis. Prepared for the Arizona State Parks Board 15 March 1959, Reformatted by Tubac Presidio State Historical Park August 1995 and revised. Available on line at: http://parentseyes.arizona.edu/tubac/index.html
 Doyel, D. E., 1977 Excavations in the Middle Santa Cruz River Valley, Southeastern Arizona. Contribution to Highway Salvage Archaeology in Arizona, Number 44. Arizona State Museum, University of Arizona, Tucson.
 Fratt, Lee, 1981; Tumacacori Plaza Excavation, 1979: Historical Archaeology at Tumacacori National Monument, Arizona. Publications in Anthropology 16. Tucson, AZ: Western Archaeological and Conservation Center, National Park Service.
 Seymour, Deni J., 1993; "Piman Settlement Survey in the Middle Santa Cruz River Valley, Santa Cruz County, Arizona." Report submitted to Arizona State Parks in fulfillment of survey and planning grant contract requirements.
 Seymour, Deni J., 2007a; "Delicate Diplomacy on a Restless Frontier: Seventeenth-Century Sobaípuri Social And Economic Relations in Northwestern New Spain, Part I." New Mexico Historical Review, Volume 82, no. 4.
 Seymour, Deni J., 2008; "Delicate Diplomacy on a Restless Frontier: Seventeenth-Century Sobaípuri Social And Economic Relations in Northwestern New Spain, Part II." New Mexico Historical Review, Volume 83, no. 2.
 Seymour, Deni J., 2007b; "A Syndetic Approach to Identification of the Historic Mission Site of San Cayetano del Tumacácori." International Journal of Historical Archaeology, Vol. 11(3):269–296.

External links

 NPS – Tumacácori National Historical Park: Mission San José de Tumacácori
 NPS – Kino Missions: Mission San José de Tumacácori
 Mission San José de Tumacácori (photographs)
 Photographs and architectural drawings of Tumacacori Mission from Historic American Buildings Survey
 

Tumacácori National Historical Park
Spanish missions in Arizona
Buildings and structures in Santa Cruz County, Arizona
1691 establishments in the Spanish Empire
Populated places established in 1691
Former populated places in Santa Cruz County, Arizona
History of Santa Cruz County, Arizona
Catholic Church in Arizona
National Park Service areas in Arizona
Tourist attractions in Santa Cruz County, Arizona
Spanish Colonial architecture in Arizona